Burdette Eliele "Burdie" Haldorson (born January 12, 1934) is a former American basketball player who competed in the 1956 Summer Olympics and in the 1960 Summer Olympics.  Haldorson played college basketball for the Colorado Buffaloes.

He was part of the American basketball team that won the gold medal in 1956. He never played professionally, but was a member of the AAU Phillips 66ers for a number of years.

Four years later, in 1960, he won his second gold medal as part of the American team.  He was inducted into the Pac-12 Basketball Hall of Honor during the 2012 Pac-12 Conference men's basketball tournament, March 10, 2012.

References

External links
 
 
Burdette Haldorson at USA Basketball

1934 births
Living people
American men's basketball players
Basketball players at the 1956 Summer Olympics
Basketball players at the 1959 Pan American Games
Basketball players at the 1960 Summer Olympics
Colorado Buffaloes men's basketball players
Basketball players from Minnesota
Medalists at the 1956 Summer Olympics
Medalists at the 1960 Summer Olympics
Olympic gold medalists for the United States in basketball
Pan American Games gold medalists for the United States
Pan American Games medalists in basketball
People from Austin, Minnesota
Phillips 66ers players
St. Louis Hawks draft picks
United States men's national basketball team players
Forwards (basketball)
Medalists at the 1959 Pan American Games